In the oldest texts of Buddhism, dhyāna or jhāna is a component of the training of the mind (bhavana), commonly translated as meditation, to withdraw the mind from the automatic responses to sense-impressions, "burn up" the defilements, and leading to a "state of perfect equanimity and awareness (upekkhā-sati-parisuddhi)." Dhyāna may have been the core practice of pre-sectarian Buddhism, in combination with several related practices which together lead to perfected mindfulness and detachment.

In the later commentarial tradition, which has survived in present-day Theravāda, dhyāna is equated with "concentration", a state of one-pointed absorption in which there is a diminished awareness of the surroundings. In the contemporary Theravāda-based Vipassana movement, this absorbed state of mind is regarded as unnecessary and even non-beneficial for the first stage of awakening, which has to be reached by mindfulness of the body and vipassanā (insight into impermanence) (Citation needed). Since the 1980s, scholars and practitioners have started to question these positions, arguing for a more comprehensive and integrated understanding and approach, based on the oldest descriptions of dhyāna in the suttas.

In Buddhist traditions of Chán and Zen (the names of which are, respectively, the Chinese and Japanese pronunciations of dhyāna), as in Theravada and Tiantai, anapanasati (mindfulness of breathing), which is transmitted in the Buddhist tradition as a means to develop dhyana, is a central practice. In the Chan/Zen-tradition this practice is ultimately based on Sarvastivāda meditation techniques transmitted since the beginning of the Common Era.

Etymology
Dhyāna, Pali jhana, from Proto-Indo-European root *√dheie-, "to see, to look", "to show". Developed into Sanskrit root √dhī and n. dhī, which in the earliest layer of text of the Vedas refers to "imaginative vision" and associated with goddess Saraswati with powers of knowledge, wisdom and poetic eloquence. This term developed into the variant √dhyā, "to contemplate, meditate, think", from which dhyāna is derived.

According to Buddhaghosa (5th century CE Theravāda exegete), the term jhāna (Skt. dhyāna) is derived from the verb jhayati, "to think or meditate", while the verb jhapeti, "to burn up", explicates its function, namely burning up opposing states, burning up or destroying "the mental defilements preventing [...] the development of serenity and insight."

Commonly translated as meditation, and often equated with "concentration", though meditation may refer to a wider scala of exercises for bhāvanā, development. Dhyāna can also mean "attention, thought, reflection".

The jhāna/dhyana-stages 
The Pāḷi canon describes four progressive states of jhāna called rūpa jhāna ("form jhāna"), and four additional meditative attainments called  arūpa ("without form").

Integrated set of practices

Meditation and contemplation form an integrated set of practices with several other practices, which are fully realized with the onset of dhyāna. As described in the Noble Eightfold Path, right view leads to leaving the household life and becoming a wandering monk. Sīla (morality) comprises the rules for right conduct. Right effort, or the four right efforts, which already contains elements of dhyana, aim to prevent the arising of unwholesome states, and to generate wholesome states. This includes indriya samvara (sense restraint), controlling the response to sensual perceptions, not giving in to lust and aversion but simply noticing the objects of perception as they appear. Right effort and mindfulness ("to remember to observe"), notably mindfulness of breathing, calm the mind-body complex, releasing unwholesome states and habitual patterns, and encouraging the development of wholesome states and non-automatic responses. By following these cumulative steps and practices, the mind becomes set, almost naturally, for the equanimity of dhyāna, reinforcing the development of wholesome states, which in return further reinforces equanimity and mindfulness.

The rūpa jhānas

The arūpa āyatanas 

Grouped into the jhāna-scheme are four meditative states referred to in the early texts as arūpa-āyatanas. These are also referred to in commentarial literature as arūpa-jhānas ("formless" or "immaterial" jhānas), corresponding to the arūpa-loka (translated as the "formless realm" or the "formless dimensions"), to be distinguished from the first four jhānas (rūpa jhānas). In the Buddhist canonical texts, the word "jhāna" is never explicitly used to denote them; they are instead referred to as āyatana. However, they are sometimes mentioned in sequence after the first four jhānas (other texts, e.g. MN 121, treat them as a distinct set of attainments) and thus came to be treated by later exegetes as jhānas. The formless jhānas are related to, or derived from, yogic meditation, while the jhānas proper are related to the cultivation of the mind. The state of complete dwelling in emptiness is reached when the eighth jhāna is transcended.

The four arūpa-āyatanas/arūpa-jhānas are:
 Fifth jhāna: infinite space (Pāḷi ākāsānañcāyatana, Skt. ākāśānantyāyatana)
 Sixth jhāna: infinite consciousness (Pāḷi viññāṇañcāyatana, Skt. vijñānānantyāyatana)
 Seventh jhāna: infinite nothingness (Pāḷi ākiñcaññāyatana, Skt. ākiṃcanyāyatana)
 Eighth jhāna: neither perception nor non-perception (Pāḷi nevasaññānāsaññāyatana, Skt. naivasaṃjñānāsaṃjñāyatana)

Although the "Dimension of Nothingness" and the "Dimension of Neither Perception nor Non-Perception" are included in the list of nine jhānas taught by the Buddha (see section on nirodha-samāpatti below), they are not included in the Noble Eightfold Path. Noble Truth number eight is sammā samādhi (Right Concentration), and only the first four jhānas are considered "Right Concentration". If he takes a disciple through all the jhānas, the emphasis is on the "Cessation of Feelings and Perceptions" rather than stopping short at the "Dimension of Neither Perception nor Non-Perception".

Nirodha-samāpatti 
Beyond the dimension of neither perception nor non-perception lies a state called nirodha samāpatti, the "cessation of perception, feelings and consciousness".
Only in commentarial and scholarly literature, this is sometimes called the "ninth jhāna". Another name for this state is saññāvedayitanirodha ("cessation of perception and feeling"). According to Buddhaghosa's Visuddhimagga (XXIII, 18), it is characterized by the temporary suppression of consciousness and its concomitant mental factors, so the contemplative reaches a state unconscious (acittaka) for a week at most. In the nirodha remain unically some elementary physiological process designated, in the Mahāvedalla-sutta, by the terms āyu and usmā.

Broader dhyana-practices
While dhyana typically refers to the four jhanas/dhyanas, the term also refers to a set of practices which seem to go back to a very early stage of the Buddhist tradition. These practices are the contemplation on the body-parts and their repulsiveness (patikulamanasikara); contemplation on the elements of which the body is composed; contemplation on the stages of decay of a dead body; and mindfulness of breathing (anapanasati). These practices are described in the Satipatthana Sutta of the Pali canon and the equivalent texts of the Chinese agamas, in which they are interwoven with the factors of the four dhyanas or the seven factors of awakening (bojjhanga). This set of practices was also transmitted via the Dhyana sutras, which are based on the Sarvastivada-tradition, forming the basis of the Chan/Zen-tradition.

Early Buddhism

The Buddhist tradition has incorporated two traditions regarding the use of jhāna. There is a tradition that stresses attaining insight (vipassanā) as the means to awakening (bodhi, prajñā, kenshō) and liberation (vimutti, nibbāna). But the Buddhist tradition has also incorporated the yogic tradition, as reflected in the use of jhāna as a concentrative practice, which is rejected in other sūtras as not resulting in the final result of liberation. One solution to this contradiction is the conjunctive use of vipassanā and samatha.

Origins of the jhana/dhyana-stages

Textual accounts
The Mahasaccaka Sutta, Majjhima Nikaya 36, narrates the story of the Buddha's awakening. According to this story, he learned two kinds of meditation from two teachers, Uddaka Rāmaputta and Āḷāra Kālāma. These forms of meditation did not lead to liberation, and he then underwent harsh ascetic practices, with which he eventually also became disillusioned. The Buddha then recalled a meditative state he entered by chance as a child:

Originally, the practice of dhyāna itself may have constituted the core liberating practice of early Buddhism, since in this state all "pleasure and pain" had waned. According to Vetter,

Possible Buddhist transformation of yogic practices
The time of the Buddha saw the rise of the śramaṇa movement, ascetic practitioners with a body of shared teachings and practices. The strict delineation of this movement into Jainism, Buddhism and brahmanical/Upanishadic traditions is a later development. According to Crangle, the development of meditative practices in ancient India was a complex interplay between Vedic and non-Vedic traditions. According to Bronkhorst, the four rūpa jhāna may be an original contribution of the Buddha to the religious practices of ancient India, forming an alternative to the ascetic practices of the Jains and similar śramaṇa traditions, while the arūpa āyatanas were incorporated from non-Buddhist ascetic traditions. 

Kalupahana argues that the Buddha "reverted to the meditational practices" he had learned from Āḷāra Kālāma and Uddaka Rāmaputta, "directed at the appeasement of mind rather than the development of insight." Moving beyond these initial practices, reflection gave him the essential insight into conditioning, and learned him how to appease his "dispostional tendencies", without either being dominated by them, nor completely annihilating them. 

Wynne argues that the attainment of the formless meditative absorption was incorporated from Brahmanical practices, and have Brahmnanical cosmogenies as their doctrinal background. Wynne therefore concludes that these practices were borrowed from a Brahminic source, namely Uddaka Rāmaputta and Āḷāra Kālāma. Yet, the Buddha rejected their goals, as they were not liberating, and discovered his own path to awakening, which "consisted of the adaptation of the old yogic techniques to the practice of mindfulness and attainment of insight." Thus "radically transform[ed]" application of yogic practices was conceptualized in the scheme of the four jhānas.

Yet, according to Bronkhorst, the Buddha's teachings developed primarily in response to Jain teachings, not Brahmanical teachings,and the account of the Buddha practicing under Uddaka Rāmaputta and Āḷāra Kālāma is entirely fictitious, and meant to flesh out the mentioning of those names in the post-enlightenment narrative in Majjhima Nikaya 36. Vishvapani notes that the Brahmanical texts cited by Wynne assumed their final form long after the Buddha's lifetime, with the Mokshadharma postdating him. Vishvapani further notes that Uddaka Rāmaputta and Āḷāra Kālāma may well have been sramanic teachers, as the Buddhist tradition asserts, not Brahmins.

Five possibilities regarding jhāna and liberation

A stock phrase in the canon states that one develops the four rupa dhyanas and then attains liberating insight. While the texts often refer to comprehending the four noble truths as constituting this "liberating insight", Schmithausen notes that the four noble truths as constituting "liberating insight" (here referring to paññā) is a later addition to texts such as Majjhima Nikaya 36. 

Schmithausen discerns three possible roads to liberation as described in the suttas, to which Vetter adds a fourth possibility, while the attainment of nirodha-samāpatti may constitute a fifth possibility:
 Mastering the four jhānas, whereafter "liberating insight" is attained;
 Mastering the four jhānas and the four arūpas, whereafter "liberating insight" is attained;
 Liberating insight itself suffices;
 The four jhānas themselves constituted the core liberating practice of early Buddhism, c.q. the Buddha;
 Liberation is attained in nirodha-samāpatti.

Rūpa jhāna followed by liberating insight

According to the Theravada-tradition, the meditator uses the jhāna state to bring the mind to rest, and to strengthen and sharpen the mind, in order to investigate the true nature of phenomena (dhamma) and to gain insight into impermanence, suffering and not-self. According to the Theravada-tradition, the arahant is aware that the jhānas are ultimately unsatisfactory, realizing that the meditative attainments are also anicca, impermanent.

In the Mahasaccaka Sutta (Majjhima Nikaya 36), which narrates the story of the Buddha's awakening, dhyāna is followed by insight into the four noble truths. The mention of the four noble truths as constituting "liberating insight" is probably a later addition. Vetter notes that such insight is not possible in a state of dhyāna, when interpreted as concentration, since discursive thinking is eliminated in such a state. He also notes that the emphasis on "liberating insight" developed only after the four noble truths were introduced as an expression of what this "liberating insight" constituted. In time, other expressions took over this function, such as pratītyasamutpāda and the emptiness of the self.

Rūpa jhāna and the arūpas, followed by liberating insight
This scheme is rejected by scholars as a later development, since the arūpas are akin to non-Buddhist practices, and rejected elsewhere in the canon.

Insight alone suffices
The emphasis on "liberating insight" alone seems to be a later development, in response to developments in Indian religious thought, which saw "liberating insight" as essential to liberation. This may also have been due to an over-literal interpretation by later scholastics of the terminology used by the Buddha, and to the problems involved with the practice of dhyana, and the need to develop an easier method.

Contemporary scholars have discerned a broader application of jhāna in historical Buddhist practice. According to Alexander Wynne, the ultimate aim of dhyāna was the attainment of insight, and the application of the meditative state to the practice of mindfulness. According to Frauwallner, mindfulness was a means to prevent the arising of craving, which resulted simply from contact between the senses and their objects. According to Frauwallner, this may have been the Buddha's original idea. According to Wynne, this stress on mindfulness may have led to the intellectualism which favoured insight over the practice of dhyāna.

Jhāna itself is liberating
Both Schmithausen and Bronkhorst note that the attainment of insight, which is a cognitive activity, cannot be possible in a state wherein all cognitive activity has ceased. According to Vetter, the practice of Rupa Jhāna itself may have constituted the core practice of early Buddhism, with practices such as sila and mindfulness aiding its development. It is the "middle way" between self-mortification, ascribed by Bronkhorst to Jainism, and indulgence in sensual pleasure. Vetter emphasizes that dhyana is a form of non-sensual happiness. The eightfold path can be seen as a path of preparation which leads to the practice of samadhi.

Liberation in nirodha-samāpatti
According to some texts, after progressing through the eight jhānas and the stage of nirodha-samāpatti, a person is liberated. According to some traditions someone attaining the state of nirodha-samāpatti is an anagami or an arahant. In the Anupadda sutra, the Buddha narrates that Sariputta became an arahant upon reaching it.

Theravada

The five hindrances  
In the commentarial tradition, the development of jhāna is described as the development of five mental factors (Sanskrit: caitasika; Pali: cetasika) that counteract the five hindrances:

 vitakka ("applied thought") counteracts sloth and torpor (lethargy and drowsiness)
 vicāra ("sustained thought") counteracts doubt (uncertainty)
 pīti (rapture) counteracts ill-will (malice)
 sukha (non-sensual pleasure) counteracts restlessness-worry (excitation and anxiety)
 ekaggata (one-pointedness) counteracts sensory desire

Jhana as concentration
Buddhagosa's Visuddhimagga considers jhana to be an exercise in concentration-meditation. His views, together with the Satipatthana Sutta, inspired the development, in the 19th and 20th century, of new meditation techniques which gained a great popularity among lay audiences in the second half of the 20th century.

Samadhi

According to Henepola Gunaratana, the term "jhana" is closely connected with "samadhi", which is generally rendered as "concentration". The word "samadhi" is almost interchangeable with the word "samatha", serenity. According to Gunaratana, in the widest sense the word samadhi is being used for the practices which lead to the development of serenity. In this sense, samadhi and jhana are close in meaning. Nevertheless, they are not exactly identical, since "certain differences in their suggested and contextual meanings prevent unqualified identification of the two terms." Samadhi signifies only one mental factor, namely one-pointedness, while the word "jhana" encompasses the whole state of consciousness, "or at least the whole group of mental factors individuating that meditative state as a jhana." Furthermore, according to Gunaratana, samadhi involves "a wider range of reference than jhana", noting that "the Pali exegetical tradition recognizes three levels of samadhi: preliminary concentration (parikammasamadhi) [...] access concentration (upacarasamadhi) [...] and absorption concentration (appanasamadhi)."

Development and application of concentration
According to the Pāli canon commentary, access/neighbourhood concentration (upacāra-samādhi) is a stage of meditation that the meditator reaches before entering into jhāna. The overcoming of the five hindrances mark the entry into access concentration. Access concentration is not mentioned in the discourses of the Buddha, but there are several suttas where a person gains insight into the Dhamma on hearing a teaching from the Buddha.

According to Tse-fu Kuan, at the state of access concentration, some meditators may experience vivid mental imagery, which is similar to a vivid dream. They are as vivid as if seen by the eye, but in this case the meditator is fully aware and conscious that they are seeing mental images. According to Tse-fu Kuan, this is discussed in the early texts, and expanded upon in Theravāda commentaries.

According to Venerable Sujivo, as the concentration becomes stronger, the feelings of breathing and of having a physical body will completely disappear, leaving only pure awareness. At this stage inexperienced meditators may become afraid, thinking that they are going to die if they continue the concentration, because the feeling of breathing and the feeling of having a physical body has completely disappeared. They should not be so afraid and should continue their concentration in order to reach "full concentration" (jhāna).

A meditator should first master the lower jhānas, before they can go into the higher jhānas. According to Nathan Katz, the early suttas state that "the most exquisite of recluses" is able to attain any of the jhānas and abide in them without difficulty.

According to the contemporary Vipassana-movement, the jhāna state cannot by itself lead to enlightenment as it only suppresses the defilements. Meditators must use the jhāna state as an instrument for developing wisdom by cultivating insight, and use it to penetrate the true nature of phenomena through direct cognition, which will lead to cutting off the defilements and nibbana.

According to the later Theravāda commentorial tradition as outlined by Buddhagoṣa in his Visuddhimagga, after coming out of the state of jhāna the meditator will be in the state of post-jhāna access concentration. In this state the investigation and analysis of the true nature of phenomena begins, which leads to insight into the characteristics of impermanence, suffering and not-self arises.

Criticism

While the jhānas are often understood as deepening states of concentration, due to its description as such in the Abhidhamma, and the Visuddhimagga, since the 1980s both academic scholars and contemporary Theravādins have started to question this understanding, raising questions about the interpretation of the jhanas as being states of absorption which are not necessary for the attainment of liberation. While groundbreaking research on this topic has been done by Bareau, Schmithausen, Stuart-Fox, Bucknell, Vetter, Bronkhorst, and Wynne, Theravada practitioners have also scrutinized and criticised the samatha-vipassana distinction. Reassessments of the description of jhana in the suttas consider jhana and vipassana to be an integrated practice, leading to a "tranquil and equanimous awareness of whatever arises in the field of experience."

Scholarly criticism
While the commentarial tradition regards vitarka and vicara as initial and sustained concentration on a meditation object, Roderick S. Bucknell notes that vitarka and vicara may refer to "probably nothing other than the normal process of discursive thought, the familiar but usually unnoticed stream of mental imagery and verbalization." Bucknell further notes that "[t]hese conclusions conflict with the widespread conception of the first jhāna as a state of deep concentration."

According to Stuart-Fox, the Abhidhamma separated vitarka from vicara, and ekaggata (one-pointedness) was added to the description of the first dhyāna to give an equal number of five hindrances and five antidotes. The commentarial tradition regards the qualities of the first dhyāna to be antidotes to the five hindrances, and ekaggata may have been added to the first dhyāna to give exactly five antidotes for the five hindrances. Stuart-Fox further notes that vitarka, being discursive thought, will do very little as an antidote for sloth and torpor, reflecting the inconsistencies which were introduced by the scholastics.

Vetter, Gombrich and Wynne note that the first and second jhana represent the onset of dhyāna due to withdrawal and right effort c.q. the four right efforts, followed by concentration, whereas the third and fourth jhāna combine concentration with mindfulness. Polak, elaborating on Vetter, notes that the onset of the first dhyāna is described as a quite natural process, due to the preceding efforts to restrain the senses and the nurturing of wholesome states. Regarding samādhi as the eighth step of the Noble Eightfold Path, Vetter notes that samādhi consists of the four stages of dhyāna meditation, but

According to Richard Gombrich, the sequence of the four rūpa jhānas describes two different cognitive states: "I know this is controversial, but it seems to me that the third and fourth jhanas are thus quite unlike the second." Gombrich and Wynne note that, while the second jhāna denotes a state of absorption, in the third and fourth jhāna one comes out of this absorption, being mindfully aware of objects while being indifferent to them. According to Gombrich, "the later tradition has falsified the jhana by classifying them as the quintessence of the concentrated, calming kind of meditation, ignoring the other—and indeed higher—element. According to Lusthaus, "mindfulness in [the fourth dhyana] is an alert, relaxed awareness detached from positive and negative conditioning."

Gethin, followed by Polak and Arbel, further notes that there is a "definite affinity" between the four jhānas and the bojjhaṅgā, the seven factors of awakening. According to Gethin, the early Buddhist texts have "a broadly consistent vision" regarding meditation practice. Various practices lead to the development of the factors of awakening, which are not only the means to, but also the constituents of, awakening. According to Gethin, satipaṭṭhāna and ānāpānasati are related to a formula that summarizes the Buddhist path to awakening as "abandoning the hindrances, establishing [...] mindfulness, and developing the seven factors of awakening." This results in a "heightened awareness", "overcoming distracting and disturbing emotions", which are not particular elements of the path to awakening, but rather common disturbing and distracting emotions. Gethin further states that "the exegetical literature is essentially true to the vision of meditation presented in the Nikayas," applying the "perfect mindfulness, stillness and lucidity" of the jhanas to the contemplation of "reality", of the way things really are, as temporary and ever-changing. It is in this sense that "the jhana state has the transcendent, transforming quality of awakening."

Alexander Wynne states that the dhyāna-scheme is poorly understood. According to Wynne, words expressing the inculcation of awareness, such as sati, sampajāno, and upekkhā, are mistranslated or understood as particular factors of meditative states, whereas they refer to a particular way of perceiving the sense objects:

Upekkhā, equanimity, which is perfected in the fourth dhyāna, is one of the four Brahmā-vihāra. While the commentarial tradition downplayed the importance of the Brahmā-vihāra, Gombrich notes that the Buddhist usage of the term Brahmā-vihāra originally referred to an awakened state of mind, and a concrete attitude toward other beings which was equal to "living with Brahman" here and now. The later tradition took those descriptions too literally, linking them to cosmology and understanding them as "living with Brahman" by rebirth in the Brahmā-world. According to Gombrich, "the Buddha taught that kindness—what Christians tend to call love—was a way to salvation.

Contemporary Theravada reassessment - the "Jhana wars"
While Theravada-meditation was introduced to the west as vipassana-meditation, which rejected the usefulness of jhana, there is a growing interest among western vipassana-practitioners in jhana. The nature and practice of jhana is a topic of debate and contention among western convert Theravadins, to the extent that the disputes have even been called "the Jhana wars."

Criticism of Visudhimagga
The Visuddhimagga, and the "pioneering popularizing work of Daniel Goleman", has been influential in the (mis)understanding of dhyana being a form of concentration-meditation. The Visuddhimagga is centered around kasina-meditation, a form of concentration-meditation in which the mind is focused on a (mental) object. According to Thanissaro Bhikkhu, "[t]he text then tries to fit all other meditation methods into the mold of kasina practice, so that they too give rise to countersigns, but even by its own admission, breath meditation does not fit well into the mold."  According to Thanissaro Bhikkhu, "the Visuddhimagga uses a very different paradigm for concentration from what you find in the Canon."  In its emphasis on kasina-meditation, the Visuddhimagga departs from the Pali Canon, in which dhyana is the central meditative practice, indicating that what "jhana means in the commentaries is something quite different from what it means in the Canon."

Bhante Henepola Gunaratana also notes that what "the suttas say is not the same as what the Visuddhimagga says [...] they are actually different," leading to a divergence between a [traditional] scholarly understanding and a practical understanding based on meditative experience. Gunaratana further notes that Buddhaghosa invented several key meditation terms which are not to be found in the suttas, such as "parikamma samadhi (preparatory concentration), upacara samadhi (access concentration), appanasamadhi (absorption concentration)." Gunaratana also notes that Buddhaghosa's emphasis on kasina-meditation is not to be found in the suttas, where dhyana is always combined with mindfulness.

According to scholar Tilman Vetter, dhyana as a preparation of discriminating insight must have been different from the dhyana-practice introduced by the Buddha, using kasina-exercises to produce a "more artificially produced dhyana", resulting in the cessation of apperceptions and feelings. Shankman notes that kasina-exercises are propagated in Buddhaghosa's Visuddhimagga, which is considered the authoritative commentary on meditation practice in the Theravada tradition, but differs from the Pali canon in its description of jhana. While the suttas connect samadhi to mindfulness and awareness of the body, for Buddhaghosa jhana is a purely mental exercise, in which one-pointed concentration leads to a narrowing of attention.

Jhana as integrated practice
Several western teachers (Thanissaro Bhikkhu, Leigh Brasington, Richard Shankman) make a distinction between "sutta-oriented" jhana  and "Visuddhimagga-oriented" jhana, dubbed "minimalists" and "maximalists" by Kenneth Rose.

Ṭhānissaro Bhikkhu, a western teacher in the Thai Forest Tradition, has repeatedly argued that the Pali Canon and the Visuddhimagga give different descriptions of the jhanas, regarding the Visuddhimagga-description to be incorrect. According to Ṭhānissaro Bhikkhu warns against the development of strong states of concentration. Arbel describes the fourth jhāna as "non-reactive and lucid awareness", not as a state of deep concentration.

According to Richard Shankman, the sutta descriptions of jhāna practice explain that the meditator does not emerge from jhāna to practice vipassana but rather the work of insight is done whilst in jhāna itself. In particular the meditator is instructed to "enter and remain in the fourth jhāna" before commencing the work of insight in order to uproot the mental defilements.

Keren Arbel has conducted extensive research on the jhanas and the contemporary criticisms of the commentarial interpretation. Based on this research, and her own experience as a senior meditation-teacher, she gives a reconstructed account of the original meaning of the dhyanas. She argues that jhana is an integrated practice, describing the fourth jhana as "non-reactive and lucid awareness", not as a state of deep concentration. According to Arbel, it develops "a mind which is not conditioned by habitual reaction-patterns of likes and dislikes [...] a profoundly wise relation to experience, not tainted by any kind of wrong perception and mental reactivity rooted in craving (tanha).

According to Kenneth Rose, the Visuddhimagga-oriented "maximalist" approach is a return to ancient Indian "mainstream practices", in which physical and mental immobility was thought to lead to liberation from samsara and rebirth. This approach was rejected by the Buddha, turning to a gentler approach which results in upekkha and sati, equanimous awareness of experience.

In Mahāyāna traditions

Mahāyāna Buddhism includes numerous schools of practice. Each draw upon various Buddhist sūtras, philosophical treatises, and commentaries, and each has its own emphasis, mode of expression, and philosophical outlook. Accordingly, each school has its own meditation methods for the purpose of developing samādhi and prajñā, with the goal of ultimately attaining enlightenment.

Preservation of dhyana as open awareness
Both Polak and Arbel suggest that the traditions of Dzogchen, Mahamudra and Chan preserve or resemble dhyana as an open awareness of body and mind, thus transcending the dichotomy between vipassana and samatha.

Chan Buddhism

Anapanasati and dhyāna are a central aspect of Buddhist practice in Chan, necessary for progress on the path and "true entry into the Dharma".

Origins
The word and the practice of meditation entered into Chinese through the translations of An Shigao (fl. c. 148–180 CE), and Kumārajīva (334–413 CE), who translated Dhyāna sutras, which were influential early meditation texts mostly based on the Yogacara meditation teachings of the Sarvāstivāda school of Kashmir circa 1st–4th centuries CE. The word chán became the designation for Chan Buddhism (Korean Seon, Vietnamese Thiền, Japanese Zen).

In Chinese Buddhism, following the Ur-text of the Satipatthana Sutra and the dhyana sutras, dhyāna refers to various kinds of meditation techniques and their preparatory practices, which are necessary to practice dhyana. The five main types of meditation in the Dhyana sutras are anapanasati (mindfulness of breathing); paṭikūlamanasikāra meditation, mindfulness of the impurities of the body; loving-kindness maitrī meditation; the contemplation on the twelve links of pratītyasamutpāda; and the contemplation on the Buddha's thirty-two Characteristics.

Downplaying the body-recollections (but maintaining the awareness of imminent death), the early Chan-tradition developed the notions or practices of wu nian ("no thought, no "fixation on thought, such as one's own views, experiences, and knowledge") and fēi sīliàng (Japanese: hishiryō, "nonthinking"); and kanxin ("observing the mind") and shou-i pu i ("maintaining the one without wavering") turning the attention from the objects of experience, to the nature of mind, the perceiving subject itself, which is equated with Buddha-nature.

Mindfulness

Observing the breath

During sitting meditation, practitioners usually assume a position such as the lotus position, half-lotus, Burmese, or yoga postures, using the dhyāna mudrā. To regulate the mind, awareness is directed towards counting or watching the breath or by bringing that awareness to the energy center below the navel (see also ānāpānasati). Often, a square or round cushion placed on a padded mat is used to sit on; in some other cases, a chair may be used. This practice may simply be called sitting dhyāna, which is zuòchán in Chinese, zazen in Japanese,  in Korean, and tọa thiền in Vietnamese .

Observing the mind
In the Sōtō school of Zen, meditation with no objects, anchors, or content, is the primary form of practice. The meditator strives to be aware of the stream of thoughts, allowing them to arise and pass away without interference. Considerable textual, philosophical, and phenomenological justification of this practice can be found throughout Dōgen's Shōbōgenzō, as for example in the "Principles of Zazen" and the "Universally Recommended Instructions for Zazen". In the Japanese language, this practice is called Shikantaza.

Insight

Pointing to the nature of the mind
According to Charles Luk, in the earliest traditions of Chán, there was no fixed method or formula for teaching meditation, and all instructions were simply heuristic methods, to point to the true nature of the mind, also known as Buddha-nature. According to Luk, this method is referred to as the "Mind Dharma", and exemplified in the story of Śākyamuni Buddha holding up a flower silently, and Mahākāśyapa smiling as he understood. A traditional formula of this is, "Chán points directly to the human mind, to enable people to see their true nature and become buddhas."

Kōan practice

At the beginning of the Sòng dynasty, practice with the kōan method became popular, whereas others practiced "silent illumination". This became the source of some differences in practice between the Línjì and Cáodòng schools.

A kōan, literally "public case", is a story or dialogue, describing an interaction between a Zen master and a student. These anecdotes give a demonstration of the master's insight. Koans emphasize the non-conceptional insight that the Buddhist teachings are pointing to. Koans can be used to provoke the "great doubt", and test a student's progress in Zen practice.

Kōan-inquiry may be practiced during zazen (sitting meditation), kinhin (walking meditation), and throughout all the activities of daily life. Kōan practice is particularly emphasized by the Japanese Rinzai school, but it also occurs in other schools or branches of Zen depending on the teaching line.

The Zen student's mastery of a given kōan is presented to the teacher in a private interview (referred to in Japanese as dokusan (独参), daisan (代参), or sanzen (参禅)). While there is no unique answer to a kōan, practitioners are expected to demonstrate their understanding of the kōan and of Zen through their responses. The teacher may approve or disapprove of the answer and guide the student in the right direction. The interaction with a Zen teacher is central in Zen, but makes Zen practice also vulnerable to misunderstanding and exploitation.

Vajrayāna
B. Alan Wallace holds that modern Tibetan Buddhism lacks emphasis on achieving levels of concentration higher than access concentration. According to Wallace, one possible explanation for this situation is that virtually all Tibetan Buddhist meditators seek to become enlightened through the use of tantric practices. These require the presence of sense desire and passion in one's consciousness, but jhāna effectively inhibits these phenomena.

While few Tibetan Buddhists, either inside or outside Tibet, devote themselves to the practice of concentration, Tibetan Buddhist literature does provide extensive instructions on it, and great Tibetan meditators of earlier times stressed its importance.

Related concepts in Indian religions

Dhyana is an important ancient practice mentioned in the Vedic and post-Vedic literature of Hinduism, as well as early texts of Jainism. Dhyana in Buddhism influenced these practices as well as was influenced by them, likely in its origins and its later development.

Parallels with Patanjali's Ashtanga Yoga

There are parallels with the fourth to eighth stages of Patanjali's Ashtanga Yoga, as mentioned in his classical work, Yoga Sutras of Patanjali, which were compiled around 400 CE by, taking materials about yoga from older traditions.

Patanjali discerns bahiranga (external) aspects of yoga namely, yama, niyama, asana, pranayama, and the antaranga (internal) yoga. Having actualized the pratyahara stage, a practitioner is able to effectively engage into the practice of Samyama. At the stage of pratyahara, the consciousness of the individual is internalized in order that the sensations from the senses of taste, touch, sight, hearing and smell don't reach their respective centers in the brain and takes the sadhaka (practitioner) to next stages of Yoga, namely Dharana (concentration), Dhyana (meditation), and Samadhi (mystical absorption), being the aim of all Yogic practices.

The Eight Limbs of the yoga sutras show Samadhi as one of its limbs. The Eight limbs of the Yoga Sutra was influenced by Buddhism. Vyasa's Yogabhashya, the commentary to the Yogasutras, and Vacaspati Misra's subcommentary state directly that the samadhi techniques are directly borrowed from the Buddhists' Jhana, with the addition of the mystical and divine interpretations of mental absorption. The Yoga Sutra, especially the fourth segment of Kaivalya Pada, contains several polemical verses critical of Buddhism, particularly the Vijñānavāda school of Vasubandhu.

The suttas show that during the time of the Buddha, Nigantha Nataputta, the Jain leader, did not even believe that it is possible to enter a state where the thoughts and examination stop.

See also
 Research on meditation
 Altered state of consciousness
 Jñāna

Notes

References

Sources

Further reading
Scholarly (philological/historical)
 Analayo (2017), Early Buddhist Meditation Studies (defence of traditional Theravada position)
 
 
 Polak (2011), Reexamining Jhana
 
 

Re-assessment of jhana in Theravada
 
 
 Shankman, Richard (2008), The Experience of Samadhi

External links 
 From Sutta Pitaka
"Jhana" (2005), descriptions and similes from the Pali Canon's Anguttara Nikaya and Dhammapada, by John T. Bullitt.
 Theravādin Buddhist perspective
 Henepola Gunaratana, Jhanas in Theravada Buddhist Meditation
 Ajahn Brahmavamso, Travelogue to the four Jhanas
 Ajahn Brahmavamso, The Jhanas
 Thanissaro Bhikkhu, Jhana not by the numbers
 Bhante Vimalaramsi Mahāthera, MN 111 One by One as They Occurred – Anupada Sutta. Dhamma-Talks on the Anupada-Sutta. This provides a highly detailed account of the progression through the jhānas.
 Sutta-style jhanas: a western phenomenon?, Dhamma Wheel
Mahayana
 Nagarjuna, Commentary in the Four Dhyanas
Others
 Leigh Breighton, Interpretations of the Jhanas
 Jhana Wars!, Simple|Suttas
O'Brien, Barbara. "Jhanas or Dhyanas: A Progression of Buddhist Meditation." Learn Religions, 28 Sept. 2018.

Buddhist meditation
Zen Buddhist philosophical concepts
Mindfulness (Buddhism)
Sanskrit words and phrases